Ngawha Springs is a small settlement and hot water springs approximately  five kilometres east of the town of Kaikohe in Northland, New Zealand. Ngāwhā means "boiling spring".

The springs reputedly have therapeutic, balneological properties for those who bathe in their waters, and is the source of the steam used at the Ngawha geothermal field's power station. The nearby Northland Region Corrections Facility is the only prison in Northland.

Ngāwhā Marae and its meeting house, E Koro Kia Tutuki, are a traditional meeting place for the local Ngāpuhi hapū of Ngāti Kiriahi, Ngāti Mau, Ngāti Rangi, Te Uri Hoatau and Te Uri Taniwha.

Hot springs
The main Ngāwhā Springs pool complex has 16 public pools and 8 private pools. The pools vary in temperature from the rather cool 32 °C / 89 °F to the extremely hot "Favourite" and "Doctor". The complex was refurbished in 2020–21, including a new building with changing rooms, a cafe, ticket office, shop and rooms for health practitioners. The previous major upgrade of facilities had been in the late 1970s.

The nearby Ginns Ngawha Spa was closed in 2015, then reopened temporarily while Ngāwhā Springs was being refurbished in 2020–21. The two complexes are managed by the Parahirahi Ngāwhā Waiariki Trust.

Demographics
Statistics New Zealand describes Ngāwhā Springs as a rural settlement. The settlement is part of the larger Ngapuhi statistical area.

Ngāwhā Springs had a population of 147 at the 2018 New Zealand census, an increase of 24 people (19.5%) since the 2013 census, and an increase of 15 people (11.4%) since the 2006 census. There were 54 households, comprising 69 males and 78 females, giving a sex ratio of 0.88 males per female. The median age was 33.8 years (compared with 37.4 years nationally), with 36 people (24.5%) aged under 15 years, 24 (16.3%) aged 15 to 29, 69 (46.9%) aged 30 to 64, and 18 (12.2%) aged 65 or older.

Ethnicities were 30.6% European/Pākehā, 83.7% Māori, 2.0% Pacific peoples, 2.0% Asian, and 4.1% other ethnicities. People may identify with more than one ethnicity.

Although some people chose not to answer the census's question about religious affiliation, 49.0% had no religion, 28.6% were Christian, 8.2% had Māori religious beliefs, and 8.2% had other religions.

Of those at least 15 years old, 9 (8.1%) people had a bachelor's or higher degree, and 21 (18.9%) people had no formal qualifications. The median income was $17,300, compared with $31,800 nationally. 6 people (5.4%) earned over $70,000 compared to 17.2% nationally. The employment status of those at least 15 was that 33 (29.7%) people were employed full-time, 9 (8.1%) were part-time, and 27 (24.3%) were unemployed.

References

External links
 Ngawha.nz

Hot springs of New Zealand
Populated places in the Northland Region
Kaikohe
Far North District